Alfred Travers (born 1906, date of death unknown) was a Turkish-born British screenwriter and film director,

Filmography
 Non Stop nach Afrika (short) (1933) (as Alfred Jungermann)
 Kuddelmuddel (short) (1934) (as Alfred Jungermann)
 Men of Tomorrow (1942)
 Glorious Colours (1943)
 Their Invisible Inheritance (short) (1945)
 Beyond the Pylons (short) (1945)
 Meet the Navy (1946)
 Dual Alibi (1947)
 The Strangers Came (1949)
 Solution by Phone (1954)
 Don Giovanni (1955)
 Alive on Saturday (1957)
 Men of Tomorrow (short) (1959)
 Girls of the Latin Quarter (1960)
 The Primitives (1962)
 Raka (1968)
 One for the Pot (1968)

References

External links
 

1906 births
Year of death missing
British film directors
Film people from Istanbul
Turkish emigrants to the United Kingdom